"I'll Never Be in Love Again" is a song written by Bob Corbin, and recorded by American country music artist Don Williams.  It was released in June 1987 as the fifth single from the album New Moves.  The song reached number 4 on the Billboard Hot Country Singles & Tracks chart

Charts

Weekly charts

Year-end charts

References

1987 singles
1987 songs
Don Williams songs
Song recordings produced by Garth Fundis
Capitol Records Nashville singles
Songs written by Bob Corbin (songwriter)